Seydouba Cissé (born 10 February 2001) is a Guinean footballer who plays as a midfielder for Spanish club CD Leganés and the Guinea national team.

Club career
Born in Dabola, Cissé began his career at local side FC Attouga, and had failed trials at RSC Anderlecht, Odense Boldklub and Vejle BK. On 16 January 2020, he joined CD Leganés, being initially assigned to the C-team in the regional leagues.

Ahead of the 2020–21 season, Cissé was promoted to the reserves in Tercera División. He made his first team debut on 10 September 2021, coming on as a late substitute for fellow youth graduate Naim García in a 1–2 Segunda División away loss against Sporting de Gijón.

Cissé scored his first professional goal on 11 February 2022, netting the opener in a 2–1 home win over Real Zaragoza. Thirteen days later, he renewed his contract until 2026.

International career
Cissé was called up to the Guinea National Team for a set of 2023 Africa Cup of Nations qualification matches in June 2022.He made his debut with Guinea on June 5, 2022 he did it in a 1-0 defeat against Egypt.

Career statistics

Club

International

References

External links

2001 births
Living people
People from Dabola
Guinean footballers
Association football midfielders
Segunda División players
Segunda Federación players
Tercera División players
Divisiones Regionales de Fútbol players
CD Leganés B players
CD Leganés players
Guinea international footballers
Guinean expatriate footballers
Guinean expatriate sportspeople in Spain
Expatriate footballers in Spain